Manchester is the most populous municipality in the U.S. state of New Hampshire and in northern New England, a region comprising the states of Maine, New Hampshire, and Vermont. At the 2020 census, it had a population of 115,644.

Manchester is, along with the city of Nashua, one of two seats of New Hampshire's most populous county, Hillsborough County. Manchester lies near the northern end of the Northeast megalopolis and straddles the banks of the Merrimack River. It was first named by the merchant and inventor Samuel Blodgett, namesake of Samuel Blodget Park and Blodget Street in the city's North End. His vision was to create a great industrial center similar to that of the original Manchester in England, which was the world's first industrialized city.

History

The native Pennacook people called Amoskeag Falls on the Merrimack River—the area that became the heart of Manchester—Namaoskeag, meaning "good fishing place". In 1722, John Goffe III settled beside Cohas Brook, later building a dam and sawmill at what was dubbed "Old Harry's Town". It was granted by Massachusetts in 1727 as "Tyngstown" to veterans of Queen Anne's War who served in 1703 under Captain William Tyng. But at New Hampshire's 1741 separation from Massachusetts, the grant was ruled invalid and substituted with Wilton, Maine, resulting in a 1751 rechartering by Governor Benning Wentworth as "Derryfield"—a name that lives on in Derryfield Park, Derryfield Country Club, and the private Derryfield School.

In 1807, Samuel Blodget opened a canal and lock system to allow vessels passage around the falls, part of a network developing to link the area with Boston. He envisioned a great industrial center arising, "the Manchester of America", in reference to Manchester, England, then at the forefront of the Industrial Revolution. In 1809, Benjamin Prichard and others built a water-powered cotton spinning mill on the western bank of the Merrimack. Apparently following Blodgett's suggestion, Derryfield was renamed "Manchester" in 1810, the year the mill was incorporated as the Amoskeag Cotton & Woolen Manufacturing Company. It would be purchased in 1825 by entrepreneurs from Massachusetts, expanded to three mills in 1826, and then incorporated in 1831 as the Amoskeag Manufacturing Company.

Amoskeag engineers and architects planned a model company town on the eastern bank, founded in 1838 with Elm Street as its main thoroughfare. Other products made in the community included shoes, cigars, and paper. The Amoskeag foundry made rifles, sewing machines, textile machinery, fire engines, and locomotives in a division called the Amoskeag Locomotive Works (later, the Manchester Locomotive Works). The rapid growth of the mills demanded a large influx of workers, resulting in a flood of immigrants, particularly French Canadians. Many current residents descend from these workers. In 1871, the arch dam was built on the Merrimack River, enhancing the mill's water power delivery system. By 1912, the production of woven cloth in the Millyard had reached a production rate of 50 miles in length per hour.

Throughout the late 19th century and the early 20th century, the city began to expand outward, and many streetcar suburbs such as Mast Road were built. Manchester was formerly home to a streetcar network, the Manchester Street Railway. The streetcar network was replaced with a bus network in the 1940s.

In 1922, 17,000 workers from two of the city's largest companies (Amoskeag and Stark Manufacturing Companies) went on strike for a period of nine months. After the strike, the textile industry began a slow decline, with the Great Depression hitting the city particularly hard. The Amoskeag Manufacturing Company declared bankruptcy in 1935. During the Great Flood of 1936, the McGregor Bridge was destroyed and $2.5 million of damage was incurred to the city's mills and buildings. After the flood, the Amoskeag Manufacturing Company reorganized out of bankruptcy as Amoskeag Industries, diversifying its manufacturing operations with new industries in the Millyard.

Manchester's economy benefitted from World War II, as the city was already well-positioned and equipped with industry to handle war-time production. In 1941, Grenier Field, on the city's border with Londonderry, was converted to a U.S. Army air base.

The city faced a decline in manufacturing in the 1950s and 1960s, with many Millyard buildings becoming abandoned during this time. An anthrax incident in 1957 led to the abandonment and later razing of the Arms Textile Mill along the river (today a parking lot in front of Arms Park). As part of urban renewal projects, the city filled in the Millyard canals to make room for roads and demolished several mill structures to make way for parking and roads. The Mall of New Hampshire opened in 1977, leading to further decline of downtown. However, during this time several important buildings were constructed in the downtown area, including the Hampshire Plaza in 1972 (the tallest building in New Hampshire until 1994, later renamed Brady Sullivan Plaza).

The 1980s brought renewed interest in the Millyard and downtown. The University of New Hampshire at Manchester opened a campus in the Millyard during this time, and Segway inventor Dean Kamen purchased two old mill buildings which became the headquarters for DEKA. Kamen purchased more buildings in 1984 and 1991, aiming to convert the Millyard into a high-tech center for smart manufacturing and offices. John Madden, a local developer, and Kamen worked with the city to implement capital improvements to the Millyard in the 1980s and early 1990s.

City Hall Plaza was built in downtown Manchester in 1992, to this day the tallest building in New Hampshire and northern New England. In 1991, the city went into economic decline as four major banks were shut down by federal regulators. Many shops and restaurants along the Elm Street thoroughfare closed during this time, as foot traffic declined. At the turn of the century, renewed interest in the Millyard led to a boom in development and business. Several high-tech firms opened offices or relocated to the Manchester Millyard in the 2000s, including Autodesk in 2000 and Dyn in 2004. Brady Sullivan, a local real estate developer, opened its first Millyard apartments in 2013.

Manchester has continued to grow steadily and transform itself into a cultural and commerce hub for the state of New Hampshire. The mill town's 19th-century affluence left behind some of the finest Victorian commercial, municipal, and residential architecture in the state.

Geography

Manchester is drained by the Merrimack River and its tributaries the Piscataquog River and Cohas Brook. Massabesic Lake is on the eastern border.

Neighborhoods

The Manchester Planning Board, in its 2010 Master Plan, defines 25 neighborhoods within the city. LivableMHT has drawn maps of the neighborhoods and neighborhood village centers as defined by the city. Recognition of particular neighborhoods varies, with some having neighborhood associations, but none have any legal or political authority.

The major neighborhoods, historically, include Amoskeag, Rimmon Heights, Notre Dame/McGregorville and Piscataquog/Granite Square, also known as "Piscat", on the West Side; the North End, Janeville/Corey Square, Hallsville and Bakersville on the East Side; and Youngsville and Goffes Falls on the periphery of the city.

In 2007, the city began a Neighborhood Initiatives program to "insure that our neighborhoods are vibrant, livable areas since these are the portions of the city where most of the residents spend their time living, playing, shopping and going to school." The purpose of this initiative is to foster vibrancy and redevelopment in the neighborhoods, and to restore the sense of neighborhood communities that had been overlooked in the city for some time. The city began the program with street-scape and infrastructure improvements in the Rimmon Heights neighborhood of the West Side, which has spurred growth and investment in and by the community. Despite the success of the program in Rimmon Heights, it was unclear in recent years how the city planned to implement similar programs throughout the city. The city announced plans for extending the Neighborhood Initiatives program to the Hollow neighborhood in February 2012.

Climate
Manchester has a four-season humid continental climate (Köppen Dfa), with long, cold, snowy winters, and very warm and somewhat humid summers; spring and fall in between are crisp and relatively brief transitions. On average, there are 16 days of highs at or above  and 3.0 days of lows at or below  annually. Precipitation is well-spread throughout the year, though winter is the driest season while early spring tends to be the wettest.

Demographics

The city is the center of the Manchester, New Hampshire, New England City and Town Area (NECTA), which had a population of 187,596 as of the 2010 census. As of the 2020 census, the city had a population of 115,644. The Manchester-Nashua metropolitan area, comprising all of Hillsborough County, with a population of 422,937 at the 2020 census, is home to nearly one-third of the population of New Hampshire.

As of the census of 2010, there were 109,565 residents, 45,766 households, and 26,066 families in the city. The population density was 3,320.2 people per square mile (1,281.5/km). There were 49,288 housing units at an average density of 1,493.6 per square mile (576.5/km). The racial makeup of the city was 86.1% White, 4.1% Black or African American, 0.30% Native American, 3.7% Asian, 0.1% Pacific Islander, 3.1% from some other race, and 2.7% from two or more races. Hispanic or Latino of any race were 8.1% of the population. Non-Hispanic Whites were 82.0% of the population, down from 98.0% in 1980.

In 2011, the largest ancestry groups within the city's population were: French and French-Canadian (23.9%), Irish (19.5%), English (9.9%), German (8.6%), and Italian (8.1%).

At the 2010 census, there were 45,766 households, out of which 26.4% had children under the age of 18 living with them, 38.4% were married couples living together, 13.1% had a female householder with no husband present, and 43.0% were non-families. Of all households 32.4% were made up of individuals, and 9.8% had someone living alone who was 65 years of age or older. The average household size was 2.34 persons and the average family size was 2.99.

In the city, 21.6% of the population were under the age of 18, 10.2% were age 18 to 24, 30.4% were 25 to 44, 26.0% were 45 to 64, and 11.8% were 65 years of age or older. The median age was 36.0 years. For every 100 females, there were 98.5 males. For every 100 females age 18 and over, there were 96.6 males.

In 2011, the estimated median income for a household in the city was $51,082, and the median income for a family was $63,045. Male full-time workers had a median income of $43,583 versus $37,155 for females. The per capita income for the city was $26,131. Of the population 14.1% and 9.6% of families were below the poverty line, along with 21.8% of persons who were under the age of 18 and 9.9% of persons 65 or older.

Economy

Manchester is northern New England's largest city.  Its economy has changed greatly, as Manchester was primarily a textile mill town throughout much of its history.  Manchester is nicknamed the Queen City, as well as the more recently coined "Manch Vegas". The Mall of New Hampshire, on Manchester's southern fringe near the intersection of Interstates 93 and 293, is the city's main retail center.  In 2001, the Verizon Wireless Arena, a venue seating more than 10,000, opened for major concerts and sporting events, enhancing the city's downtown revitalization efforts with a major hotel and convention center already in place across the street from the arena. The building was renamed the SNHU Arena in 2016, after Manchester's Southern New Hampshire University.

Manchester is the home of Segway, Inc., manufacturers of a two-wheeled, self-balancing electric vehicle invented by Dean Kamen.

As of 2017, the following organizations and companies were the largest employers in the Manchester ZIP Code area:

 Elliot Hospital, 3,682 employees
 Catholic Medical Center, 2,600 employees
 Southern New Hampshire University, 2,093 employees
 Eversource Energy, 1,400 employees
 FairPoint Communications, 1,050 employees
 TD Bank, 900 employees
 Citizens Bank, 700 employees
 Saint Anselm College, 689 employees
 Anthem Blue Cross Blue Shield, 500 employees

Downtown
Downtown Manchester's One City Hall Plaza stands 22 stories high, quickly followed by the all-black, 20-story Brady Sullivan Plaza, formerly known as the Hampshire Plaza. They are the tallest New England buildings north of Cambridge, Massachusetts. The Sullivan Plaza is shorter than City Hall Plaza by a mere . Other major buildings include the 18-story Wall Street Apartments tower; the 14-story, recently renamed Brady Sullivan Tower, which was the former New Hampshire Insurance building; the 12-story DoubleTree Hotel and Convention Center Manchester (which serves the SNHU Arena across the street), the Carpenter Center (a former hotel), and the Hampshire Towers condominium building; the 10-story Citizens Bank Building, which was, for much of the early- and mid-20th century, Manchester's iconic Amoskeag Bank "skyscraper"; and several high-rises of or exceeding 10 stories on the city's West Side. This partial list only includes residential and commercial buildings and does not include hospitals, spires and domes, etc.

The SNHU Arena has become the centerpiece of downtown Manchester. The venue can seat slightly less than 12,000 patrons for concerts, and at least 10,000-seat configurations for sporting and other forms of entertainment. It has also hosted major recording artists and comedians, national touring theatrical productions, family-oriented shows, and fairs since it opened in 2001. The Northeast Delta Dental Stadium (formerly MerchantsAuto.com Stadium) is a baseball park on the Merrimack River in downtown Manchester and is home to the local AA baseball affiliate of the Toronto Blue Jays, the New Hampshire Fisher Cats.  Historic Gill Stadium supported professional minor-league baseball into the early 21st century and continues to be a viable and popular downtown venue for many sporting and entertainment events, seating nearly 4,000 patrons, depending on the event format.

In recent years there has been continual redevelopment of the Amoskeag Millyard and its residential Historic District. The increasing popularity of downtown living has caused many properties originally built as tenement housing for mill workers in the 19th century to be converted to stylish, eclectic residential condominiums. Many new retail stores and higher education institutions, including the University of New Hampshire at Manchester, have been uniquely retro-fitted into properties along Commercial and Canal Street.

Shopping
Manchester has three main retail areas: downtown Manchester, South Willow Street (NH Route 28), and Second Street (NH Route 3A) on the West Side. The Mall of New Hampshire is on South Willow Street, and, with more than 125 stores, is one of the largest shopping centers in southern New Hampshire and central New England.

Arts and culture

Cultural landmarks include the historic Palace Theatre, the Currier Museum of Art, the New Hampshire Institute of Art, the Franco-American Center, the Manchester Historic Association Millyard Museum, the Massabesic Audubon Center, the Amoskeag Fishways Learning and Visitors Center, the Lawrence L. Lee Scouting Museum and Max I. Silber Library, the Zimmerman House and Kalil House designed by Frank Lloyd Wright, and the SEE Science Center. Valley Cemetery, the resting place of numerous prominent citizens since 1841, is an early example of a garden-style burial ground.

The John F. Kennedy Memorial Coliseum is another, smaller venue in downtown Manchester with a capacity of approximately 3,000 seats. It was completed in 1963, serves as home ice for the Manchester Central and Memorial High School hockey teams, and is home to the Southern New Hampshire Skating Club.

The nickname "ManchVegas" was derived from illegal gambling in local businesses during the late 1980s or early 1990s. Many pizza shops and local bars had video poker machines that would pay out real money. The nickname was coined following a citywide campaign of law enforcement. It was then adopted as a lampoon of the city's limited entertainment opportunities. The term has since become a source of pride as the city's entertainment scene has grown. By 2003, it was well enough known that a note on Virtualtourist.com said, "Residents reflect the regional dry humor by referring to sedate Manchester as 'ManchVegas'." By 2005, an article in Manchester's Hippo (a local alternative weekly) said that then-Mayor Robert A. Baines "is pushing to replace the nickname ManchVegas with Manchhattan" (meaning Manchester+Manhattan). In 2009, the film Monsters, Marriage and Murder in ManchVegas was released referencing Manchester's popular nickname and using much of the city as its backdrop.

Manchester has a growing collective of artists, due in large part to the influx of young students at the New Hampshire Institute of Art, Southern New Hampshire University, and the University of New Hampshire at Manchester. Slam Free or Die, New Hampshire's only weekly slam poetry venue, is in Manchester and was voted "Best Poetry Venue in the World"  by readers of Write Bloody Publishing.

The Manchester City Library has served the city's residents since the mid-1850s and has been housed in the Carpenter Memorial Building on Pine Street since 1914. There is a branch location on North Main Street on the West Side.

Sports
The city is home to McIntyre Ski Area, which opened in 1971. There are also college sports teams that play in and out of the city. Saint Anselm College is located less than a mile outside the city's border in Goffstown, although it has a Manchester postal address, and Southern New Hampshire University is located primarily in Hooksett, but has its campus partially within city limits. The two colleges participate in the NCAA Division II Northeast-10 Conference, and the school with the most head-to-head victories in a school year earns the Queen City Cup.

Professional
Manchester is the only city in New Hampshire with a professional sports team: three-time Eastern League champions, the New Hampshire Fisher Cats, play at Delta Dental Stadium - formerly Northeast Delta Dental Stadium. In 2021, the Eastern League was abolished and the Fisher Cats joined the newly established Double-A Northeast. The name, "Double-A Northeast" lasted only a single season and the league was renamed the Eastern League in 2022.

From 2001 to 2015, the Manchester Monarchs played in the American Hockey League. In their final season in Manchester, the Monarchs won the league championship. From 2015 to 2019, the city hosted the lower-division Manchester Monarchs in the ECHL.  Both teams were based at the SNHU Arena (formerly known as the Verizon Wireless Arena.)

From 2002 through 2009, the arena was also the home of a professional arena football team: the Manchester Wolves of AF2.

Government

Manchester is incorporated as a city under the laws of the state of New Hampshire, and operates under a strong mayoral form of government. The mayor serves as chairman of the fourteen-member Board of Mayor and Aldermen, the city's legislative body. Each of Manchester's twelve wards elects a single alderman, and two additional at-large members are elected citywide. Joyce Craig is the current mayor.

The mayor also serves as the chair of the board of school committee. Like the board of aldermen, the school board has twelve members elected by ward and two at-large members. The school board is not a city department; rather, it is a school district coterminous with the city, which obtains financing from the Board of Mayor and Aldermen.

In the New Hampshire Senate, Manchester is represented by three state senators, all Democrats:

 Kevin Cavanaugh (District 16): Wards 1, 2, 12 
 Donna Soucy (District 18): Wards 5, 6, 7, 8, 9
 Lou D'Allesandro (District 20): Wards 3, 4, 10, 11

In the New Hampshire Executive Council, Manchester is included within the 4th District and is represented by Republican Ted Gatsas, the city's former mayor. Manchester is included within New Hampshire's 1st congressional district and is represented by Democrat Chris C. Pappas.

At the presidential level, Manchester leans Democratic. George W. Bush narrowly carried the city by 170 votes in 2004, but no other presidential elections since then have been nearly as close. Joe Biden won the highest percentage of the vote in Manchester since 1964.

Education

Public schools
Manchester's public school system is run by the Manchester School District. Manchester School District has four public high schools:

 Manchester High School West
 Manchester High School Central
 Manchester Memorial High School
 Manchester School of Technology

Manchester School District has four public middle schools and fourteen elementary schools.

Private and charter schools

Manchester is served by three private high schools:

 Trinity High School, a private, Roman Catholic high school
 The Derryfield School, a private school serving sixth through twelfth grades
 Holy Family Academy, a small Roman Catholic private school serving seventh through twelfth grades

There are several charter schools in the city:

 The Founders Academy, a public charter school that began in the 2014–2015 school year for children in 6th to 12th grades
 Making Community Connections Charter School Manchester Campus, also known as MC2 (M.C. Squared), a 6th to 12th grade public charter school
 Mills Falls Charter School, a public charter school offering a Montessori education from kindergarten to 6th grade
 Polaris Charter School, a public charter school that offers elementary education
 Kreiva Academy, a public charter school in downtown Manchester for 6th to 12th grades

Other schools:

 Robert B. Jolicoeur School, a private special education school
 Mount Zion Christian Schools, a non-denominational, evangelical Christian school serving kindergarten through twelfth grade
 Saint Benedict Academy, a Catholic elementary school serving kindergarten through sixth grade (formerly Saint Raphael School and Westside Regional Catholic School)
 Cardinal Lacroix School, a K–6 Catholic elementary school that combines St. Anthony School and St. Casimir School 
 St. Catherine of Siena School, a Pre-K to 6th grade parochial elementary school
 St. Joseph Regional Junior High School, a grade 7–8 regional Catholic junior high school

Post-secondary schools
Area institutions of higher education, together enrolling more than 8,000 students, include:

 Franklin Pierce University, Manchester branch campus 
 Granite State College, Manchester branch campus
 Hellenic American University
 Manchester Community College
 Massachusetts College of Pharmacy and Health Sciences, Manchester, New Hampshire Secondary Campus
 New Hampshire Institute of Art (formerly called the Manchester Institute of Arts and Sciences)
 Southern New Hampshire University on the boundary between Manchester and Hooksett
 University of New Hampshire at Manchester, an integral college of the University of New Hampshire

Saint Anselm College, in the Pinardville neighborhood of the town of Goffstown, is adjacent to the city line and has a Manchester mailing address and telephone exchange.

Media
The city is served by the New Hampshire Union Leader (formerly the Manchester Union Leader), The Hippo, and Manchester Ink Link.

Radio
The Manchester radio market, which contains Hillsborough County and portions of Merrimack and Rockingham counties, is home to the following FM radio stations:

WEVO 89.1 (NPR), "New Hampshire Public Radio")
 WLMW 90.7 (religious programming, "New Hampshire Family Radio")
 WDER-FM 92.1 (Christian programming, "Life-Changing Radio")
 W231BR (classic hits, "Rewind 94.1")
 WMNH (Public Access - 95.3)
 WZID 95.7 (adult contemporary)
 WMLL 96.5 (classic hits, "96.5 The Mill")
 WOKQ 97.5 (country music)
 WNNH 99.1 (Adult Contemporary, "Frank FM, New Hampshire's Greatest Hits")
 WGIR-FM 101.1 (rock music, "Rock 101")
 W276BJ 103.1 (country music, "103.1 the Outlaw")
 WBNH-LP 105.1 (alternative rock, "Bedford 105-1")
 WJYY 105.5 (top 40, "105-5 JYY")
 WFNQ 106.3 (Adult Contemporary, "Frank FM, New Hampshire's Greatest Hits")
 W295BL 106.9 (classical music, simulcast of WCRB from Lowell, Massachusetts)
 WTPL 107.7 (news/talk and sports, "107.7 The Pulse of New Hampshire")

Additionally, almost all stations from Boston can be received throughout the market, along with some stations (depending on location) from Worcester, the Seacoast and/or the Lakes Region.

Television
Manchester is on the northern edge of the Boston television market. The following stations are based in Greater Manchester:

Infrastructure

Transportation

Air

Manchester-Boston Regional Airport, the fourth-largest passenger and third-largest cargo airport in New England, serves the city.

Roads
Two Interstate Highways, one U.S. Route, and six New Hampshire State Routes in the city.  These include:
 
Interstate 93
Interstate 293
U.S. Route 3
New Hampshire Route 3A
New Hampshire Route 28
New Hampshire Route 28A
NH 28 Bypass, known as Londonderry Turnpike.
New Hampshire Route 101
New Hampshire Route 114A

Bus

The Manchester Transit Authority runs several bus routes throughout the city and surrounding areas. Boston Express run commuter services to Boston and other parts of the state. Vermont Transit Lines (affiliated with Greyhound Lines) has lines to Montreal. In 2008, Boston Express moved to suburb Londonderry, New Hampshire, and now provides limited service to downtown Manchester.

Passenger rail

Into the 1950s, numerous Boston and Maine Railroad trains operated out of Manchester Union Station, going to points northwest as far as Montreal, north to Woodsville, east to Portsmouth and south to Boston, among these the Alouette and the Ambassador (both of these being Boston - Montreal trains). The last services were a once a day train between Boston and Concord; this service ended in 1967.

A proposed extension of the MBTA Commuter Rail's Lowell Line would see MBTA Commuter Rail service running as far north as Manchester with service frequencies similar to that of the current Lowell Line. A study currently being carried out by AECOM and the State of New Hampshire to design and make a financial plan for the project is due to be completed by 2023. The proposed Manchester station location would be located behind the Market Basket grocery store on Elm Street.

With the expansion of Interstate 93 to eight lanes from Salem to Manchester under construction, space is being reserved in the median for potential future commuter or light rail service along this corridor. The I-93 transit study also suggested restoring service on the Manchester and Lawrence branch for commuter and freight rail. This corridor would support freight rail along with commuter, something that light rail cannot do.

In late 2011, Dean Kamen, inventor of the Segway and owner of several buildings in the Millyard, as well as co-founder of FIRST, proposed a rail loop for downtown and the Millyard. Several meetings have been held with area business and property owners, city officials and local developers, but the idea is in the early conceptual stages.

The downtown rail loop, if approved by the Board of Mayor and Aldermen, would be about three miles long. The loop would go from the Manchester Millyards, down south for about half a mile, then turn over Elm Street, separate into two rails (the other going towards Manchester-Boston Regional Airport), and climb north to Bridge Street, ending at the Brady Sullivan Tower at the northern end of Elm Street. More concrete plans were revealed in 2018.

In 2021, Amtrak announced plans to implement new service from Boston to Concord, including a stop at Manchester, by 2035.

Public safety

Law enforcement
Law enforcement is provided by the Manchester Police Department. The Manchester police station is at 405 Valley Street on the corner of Valley and Maple.

The Hillsborough County Department of Corrections is at 445 Willow Street. The prison houses an average of 500 inmates.

Fire department

The city of Manchester is protected all year by the 200 paid, professional firefighters (IAFF Local 856) of the City of Manchester Fire Department. The department is commanded by a Chief of Department, Daniel Goonan, one Assistant Chief, and five District Chiefs. The Manchester Fire Department operates out of ten fire stations throughout the city, and operates a fire apparatus fleet of ten engines, four ladder trucks (two staffed/two cross-manned by the engine), one rescue, and one district chief (two if manpower permits). The Manchester Fire Department responds to over 26,000 emergency calls annually.

Notable people

Sister cities
 Neustadt an der Weinstraße, Germany
 Taichung, Taiwan

See also

 West Side, Manchester, New Hampshire
 USS Manchester, 2 ships

Notes

References

Further reading

 Manchester: A Brief Record of Its Past and a Picture of Its Present
 Hareven, Tamara K., and Randolph Langenbach. Amoskeag: Life and work in an American factory-city (UPNE, 1995) The Amoskeag textile factory in Manchester was the largest in the world; this is the story of its workers. online

External links

 
 

 
1751 establishments in New Hampshire
Cities in Hillsborough County, New Hampshire
Cities in New Hampshire
Company towns in New Hampshire
County seats in New Hampshire
History of the textile industry
Populated places established in 1751
New Hampshire populated places on the Merrimack River
Ukrainian communities in the United States